Soul Cookin'  is the sole album led by guitarist Thornel Schwartz, with saxophonist Bill Leslie, released in 1962 on Argo Records.

Reception 

Flophouse magazine noted: "A proficient blues player who talks the bop language without really, like better guitar players, stretching long lines over the familiar changes, Schwartz accompanies his short clusters of prickly, staccato notes with driving octave playing. The blues tunes on Soul Cookin’ benefit from Schwartz’ more crude than refined approach ... His peculiar, overdriven tone might get on your sleeve, yet gives that extra edge and is instantly recognizable".

Track listing 
 "Soul Cookin'" (Esmond Edwards) – 4:25
 "Brazil" (Ary Barroso, Bob Russell) – 4:15
 "You Won't Let Me Go" (Buddy Johnson, Bud Allen) – 9:15
 "Theme From Mutiny on the Bounty" (Bronisław Kaper) – 2:30
 "Blue and Dues" (Thornel Schwartz) – 7:20
 "I'm Getting Sentimental Over You" (George Bassman, Ned Washington) – 4:10
 "Don't You Know I Care" (Duke Ellington, Mack David) – 4:45

Personnel

Performance
Thornel Schwartz – guitar
Bill Leslie – tenor saxophone
Lawrence Olds – organ
Donald Bailey (tracks 1 & 6), Jerome Thomas (tracks 2-5 & 7) – drums

Production
 Esmond Edwards – supervision
 Rudy Van Gelder – engineer

References 

1962 albums
Thornel Schwartz albums
Argo Records albums
Albums produced by Esmond Edwards
Albums recorded at Van Gelder Studio